{{Speciesbox
|name = Cyprus bee orchid
|image = Ophrys kotschyi Pentadaktylos.JPG
|image_caption = 
|genus = Ophrys
|species = kotschyi
|authority = H.Fleischm. & Soó
|synonyms_ref = <ref>[http://apps.kew.org/wcsp/synonomy.do?name_id=345092 Kew World Checklist of Selected Plant Families, Ophrys kotschyi subsp. kotschyi]</ref>
|synonyms = *Ophrys sintenisii subsp. kotschyi (H.Fleischm. & Soó) SoóOphrys creticaOphrys cypria Renz
}}Ophrys kotschyi, the Cyprus bee orchid, is a terrestrial species of orchid native to Greece and Cyprus.Fleischmann, Andreas & Soó von Bere, Károly Rezsö. 1926.  Notizblatt des Botanischen Gartens und Museums zu Berlin-Dahlem 9: 908.Ophrys kotschyi occurs in grasslands and in open pine woodlands. It is listed as "near-threatened" by the International Union for Conservation of Nature and Natural Resources.

Subspecies
Three subspecies are recognized (as of May 2014): Some molecular studies have suggested that the Greek populations might be only superficially similar, that they evolved independently from the Cypriot populations, thus perhaps meriting recognition as a distinct species.Ophrys kotschyi subsp. ariadnae (Paulus) Faurh. - GreeceOphrys kotschyi subsp. cretica (Soó) H.Sund. - Crete and other Greek islandsOphrys kotschyi subsp. kotschyi'' – Cyprus

References

External links 
Plant Net Cyprus, Establishment of a Plant Micro-Reserve Network in Cyprus for the Conservation of Priority Species and Habitats, Ophrys kotschyi
Orchids of Cyprus, Ophrys kotschyi
Cyprus Center of Environmental Research and Education Holy Church of Limassol, The species of March, Ophrys kotschyi
Forum fur Naturfotografen, Kotschys Ragwurz (Ophrys kotschyi)

kotschyi
Orchids of Europe
Flora of Cyprus
Flora of Crete
Flora of Greece
Plants described in 1926